Albanian may refer to:

Pertaining to Albania in Southeast Europe; in particular:
Albanians, an ethnic group native to the Balkans
Albanian language
Albanian culture
Demographics of Albania, includes other ethnic groups within the country
Pertaining to other places:
Albania (disambiguation)
Albany (disambiguation)
St Albans (disambiguation)

Albanian cattle
Albanian horse

The Albanian, a 2010 German-Albanian film

See also

Olbanian language
Albani people
Albaniana (disambiguation)
Alba (disambiguation)

Language and nationality disambiguation pages